Holcocera gozmanyi is a moth in the family Blastobasidae. It was described by Adamski and Landry in 2007. It is found on the Galapagos Islands.

References

Natural History Museum Lepidoptera generic names catalog

gozmanyi
Moths described in 2007